Halič is a village and municipality in the Lučenec District in the Banská Bystrica Region of Slovakia.

History
In historical records, the village was first mentioned in 1299 (Gach) in the records of the Kingdom of Hungary as the location of a very important castle and it was part of the Kingdom until 1920. From 1554 to 1594 it was occupied by Turks. From 1938 to 1945 it again belonged to Hungary.

Halič Castle

The first appearance in literature of the castle in Halič is from the year 1450. Halič the village was first mentioned as a settlement surrounding this castle in 1299 and titled Holuch, Gach but the castle was only mentioned in passing. The castle was built without any royal permission by magister Tamas from Lučenec.

In the years 1450-51 it belonged to the Jiskras, later to János Hunyady before becoming inhabited by King Matthias Corvinus in 1462. In the first half of the 16th century it was in property of Istvan Losonczy. The castle was reconstructed, again without royal permission, by him and was damaged in 1544 during a siege. After the death of Štefan Lučenský, his daughter Anne inherited the county and married Zsigmund Forgách. The Forgáčs were one of the oldest Hungarian aristocratic family being descendants of the Great Moravian family Poznam, who had preserved their positions in Slovakia after its incorporation into the Kingdom of Hungary. The Halič castle was owned by the Forgáčs until 1945.

Zsigmond Forgách rebuilt the castle on land which had been part of the estate of the owner of the county since 1598, choosing a site that was both strategic and offering natural fortifications. In 1612 it was repaired carefully and the foundations of an irregular hexagon was laid. On top of these; a storied building with six corner bastions was constructed, secured by a ditch and mounds. Wings of this hexagon led into a courtyard with plain walls, later covered with many murals depicting figures of the Roman emperors and the Hungarian kings between its windows and entrances.

At the end of the 17th century Imre Thököly attempted to capture the castle but did not succeed. In 1678, when owned by Adam Forgáč, the castle was besieged again, on this occasion by Turks. The defenders repulsed this attack and also a second attempt in 1703.  Six years later Ferenc II Rákóczi overran the castle and in another siege; the leader of the emperor's troops, the General Sigbert Heister, managed to raze parts of the building including the roof and some of the interior equipment.

The Forgáčs had the castle reconstructed in 1762 due to the need of a representative seat in this region. The Austrian Andre Meyerhoffer, was in charge of the works, notable as he was the builder of some of the palaces in Bratislava.

In 2006, the castle was sold to a development company from Košice who repaired it and made it into a 4 star hotel with a spa.

Genealogical resources

The records for genealogical research are available at the state archive "Statny Archiv in Banska Bystrica, Slovakia"

 Roman Catholic church records (births/marriages/deaths): 1800-1895 (parish B)
 Lutheran church records (births/marriages/deaths): 1800-1895 (parish B)

See also
 List of municipalities and towns in Slovakia

References

External links
 
 
http://www.e-obce.sk/obec/halic/halic.html
http://www.tourist-channel.sk/halic/
https://web.archive.org/web/20120426001247/http://www.halic.sk/index.html
Surnames of living people in Halic

Villages and municipalities in Lučenec District
Castles in Slovakia